"Sing" is a 1971 song written by Joe Raposo for the children's television show Sesame Street as its signature song. In 1973, it gained popularity when performed by Carpenters, a #3 hit on the Billboard Hot 100.

Raposo was a staff songwriter for Sesame Street, and the song became one of the most popular on the program, sung in English, Spanish and sign language. In its initial appearance, it was sung by the show's adult human cast members (the most frequent lead singer was Bob McGrath) and Muppets, including Big Bird.

Barbra Streisand's 1972 version of the song was released as a single, reaching #28 on the Easy Listening chart and #94 on the Billboard Hot 100. Many other versions have been recorded by a variety of artists, including Trini Lopez, who recorded a Spanish-language version in 1972 that appeared on his album Viva.

Background of Carpenters version
Although Barbra Streisand had an easy-listening hit in 1972 with "Sing," Karen and Richard Carpenter heard the song for the first time as guests on the ABC television special Robert Young with the Young in 1973. They loved the song and felt that it could be a hit. It appeared as the debut single on the group's 1973 album Now & Then. It reached #3 on the Billboard Hot 100 chart and #1 on the Billboard Easy Listening chart, and it became the group's seventh gold single.

The Carpenters' recording was produced and arranged by Richard Carpenter and engineered by Ray Gerhardt. Karen Carpenter sang lead vocals, with backing vocals by herself, Richard and the Jimmy Joyce Children's Choir. Keyboards were played by Richard, bass by Joe Osborn, drums by Karen and recorders by Tom Scott.

In 1974 while touring Japan, the Carpenters recorded their first live album in Osaka. It contained a new version of the song with the children's chorus sung by the Kyoto Children's Choir. It is featured on the album Live in Japan, recorded in June 1974 and released in Japan only on March 7, 1975. The album has since been released on CD.

The 1991 box set From the Top contains a Spanglish version of the song. The title is listed as "Canta/Sing," and the song is sung with alternating Spanish and English lines. The Mexican single version contains full Spanish lyrics except for the refrain.

A new recording and remix of Carpenters' version was created in 1994 by sound engineer Roger Young.

Subsequent Sesame Street versions
Lily Tomlin sang and signed the song to a group of deaf children on Sesame Street in 1975. The same year, she played the mother of two deaf children in Robert Altman's film Nashville, and they sang the song in the film. In 1976, on the 11th episode of The Muppet Show, guest Lena Horne sang the song. Alaina Reed (as Olivia) sang it while Linda (Linda Bove) signed the lyrics on Sesame Street.

As an iconic Sesame Street song, the song was used to close several episodes and many of the show's specials, including Sesame Street: 20 and Still Counting, Sesame Street's All-Star 25th Birthday: Stars and Street Forever, Sesame Street: Unpaved, Sesame Street: 25 Wonderful Years, Sesame Street's 50th Anniversary Celebration and Sesame Street: Elmo's Playdate. It was used for the title of the 1990 documentary that eulogized Raposo, Sing! Sesame Street Remembers Joe Raposo and His Music.

The song was also used in animated segments. One such segment involves Suzie Kabloozie (voiced by Ruth Buzzi) and her cat Feff. Another involves Cab Callowmouse (parody of Cab Calloway) singing in an art museum as part of a medley. Another features a clay/sand animation segment depicting animals.

It was sampled in the opening theme of Eat Bulaga! in 1982.

In 2000, various celebrities sang the song, including Nathan Lane, Denyce Graves, Gloria Estefan, Patti LaBelle, Ben Stiller, Maya Angelou, Fran Drescher, Garth Brooks, Doug E. Doug, Vanessa Williams, R.E.M., Rosemary Clooney and Conan O'Brien. A year before the celebrity edition of the song was released, Graves sang the song solo.

The original and subsequent Sesame Street recordings were released on Sesame Street Concert/On Stage – Live! (1973), Sing the Hit Songs of Sesame Street (1974), Bert & Ernie Sing-Along (1975), Sesame Street Silver – 10th Anniversary Album (1978), Sesame Street Disco (1979), Sing: Songs of Joe Raposo (1992), Sesame Street Platinum: All Time Favorites (1995), The Bird Is the Word – Big Bird's Favorite Songs, Songs from the Street: 35 Years of Music (2003) and The Best of Elmo. A Spanish version was included in Fiesta Songs! (1998).

Personnel
Karen Carpenter – lead and backing vocals, drums
Richard Carpenter – backing vocals, piano, Wurlitzer electronic piano, celesta, orchestration
Joe Osborn – bass
Tom Scott – recorders
The Jimmy Joyce Children's Choir – backing vocals
Doug Strawn - triangle, tambourine

Barbra Streisand medley
In 1972 Barbra Streisand recorded "Make Your Own Kind of Music" in a medley with "Sing," which became a #28 hit on the Billboard Easy Listening chart but only reached #94 on the Billboard Hot 100.

Chart performance
Carpenters version

Weekly charts

Year-end charts

See also
List of number-one adult contemporary singles of 1973 (U.S.)

References

1973 singles
Songs about music
The Carpenters songs
Barbra Streisand songs
The Chicks songs
Sesame Street songs
Songs written by Joe Raposo
Pop ballads
1972 songs
A&M Records singles
1970s ballads